Julian Niehues (born 17 April 2001) is a German professional footballer who plays as a midfielder for  club 1. FC Kaiserslautern.

Early life and education
Born in Münster, Niehues attended Annette-Gymnasium before spending the final year of his education at Gymnasium Rheindahlen, whilst boarding at Borussia Mönchengladbach.

Career
Niehaus played youth football for Preußen Münster before joining Borussia Mönchengladbach in 2018 on a three-year contract, with Niehues joining their under-18 team for two seasons before being promoted to their reserve team. He made his senior debut for Borussia Mönchengladbach II on 12 September 2020 in a 2–0 win over SV Rödinghausen in the Regionalliga West. He scored 5 goals in 39 appearances across the 2020–21 season, but was released at the end of the season.

In June 2021, Niehues signed for 1. FC Kaiserslautern in the 3. Liga.

Style of play
Niehues plays primarily as a defensive midfielder but can also play as a centre-back.

References

External links

2001 births
Living people
German footballers
Sportspeople from Münster
Footballers from North Rhine-Westphalia
Association football midfielders
SC Preußen Münster players
Borussia Mönchengladbach players
Borussia Mönchengladbach II players
1. FC Kaiserslautern players
Regionalliga players
3. Liga players
2. Bundesliga players